John Kerr may refer to:

Politics

Australia
 John Kerr (governor-general) (1914–1991), Australian governor-general

New Zealand
 John Kerr (Auckland politician), New Zealand politician
 John Kerr (Nelson politician) (1830–1898), New Zealand politician

United Kingdom
 John Kerr, 7th Marquess of Lothian (1794–1841), Scottish politician and peer
 John Kerr (British politician) (1852–1925), UK MP for Preston, 1903–1906
 John Henry Kerr (1871–1934), colonial governor in British India
 John Kerr, Baron Kerr of Kinlochard (born 1942), British diplomat

United States
 John Kerr (Ohio politician) (1778–1823), mayor of Columbus, Ohio
 John Leeds Kerr (1780–1844), U.S. senator from Maryland
 John Kerr (Virginia politician) (1782–1842), Virginia politician
 John Bozman Kerr (1809–1878), U.S. representative from Maryland
 John Kerr Jr. (congressman) (1811–1879), North Carolina politician and jurist
 John H. Kerr (1873–1958), North Carolina politician
 John H. Kerr Jr. (1900–1968), North Carolina politician
 John H. Kerr III (1936–2015), North Carolina politician

Sciences
 John Kerr (physicist) (1824–1907), Scots physicist
 John Glasgow Kerr (1824–1901), physician and medical missionary
 John Martin Munro Kerr (1868–1960), Scottish professor of midwifery
 John Graham Kerr (1869–1957), Scottish embryologist and Member of Parliament
 John Kerr (pathologist) (born 1934), Australian pathologist
 John Kerr (author) (1950–2016), American editor, psychologist

Military
 John Brown Kerr (1847–1928), U.S. Army brigadier general and Medal of Honor recipient
 John Chipman Kerr (1887–1963), Canadian Victorian Cross recipient
 John Kerr (Royal Navy officer) (1937–2019), British admiral

Sports
 Jack Kerr (ice hockey) (1863–1933), Canadian
 John Kerr (Scottish cricketer) (1885–1972), Scottish cricketer from Greenock
 John Kerr (baseball) (1898–1993), American baseball player
 Jack Kerr (cricketer) (1910–2007), New Zealand cricketer
 Johnny Kerr (1932–2009), professional basketball player
 John Kerr (Australian footballer) (1934–2005), Australian rules footballer
 John Kerr Sr. (1943–2011), Scottish-born Canadian soccer player
 John Kerr (sailor) (born 1951), Canadian sailor
 John Kerr (footballer, born 1959) (1959–2006), English footballer for Tranmere Rovers, Bristol City
 John Kerr Jr. (soccer) (born 1965), American
 John Kerr (figure skater) (born 1980), Scottish ice dancer
 John Kerr (Scottish footballer), Scottish footballer

Entertainment
 John Kerr (singer) (c.1925-2006), Irish ballad singer
 John Kerr (actor) (1931–2013), American actor and lawyer
 John Kerr (broadcaster) (born 1942), Australian radio broadcaster

Other
 John Hunter Kerr (1821–1874), Scottish-born grazier, Australian photographer and collector of indigenous artifacts
 John Kerr (minister) (1852–1920), Scottish minister, sportsman and sporting author
 Jake Kerr (businessman) (John Custance Kerr, born 1944), Canadian businessman
 John Law Kerr, 1927 architect of the Radium Springs, Georgia golf course

See also
 John Ker (disambiguation)
 John G. Kerr (disambiguation)
 Kerr (surname)